Sailing at the 1996 Summer Paralympics consisted of one event, which was open to any gender and sailed in the Sonar keelboats. This was the first time sailing has been included in the paralympics where the sport was a demonstration sport along with wheelchair rugby, and not an official part of the 14 core sports on the Paralympic program, but medals were awarded. Sailing in the 1996 Summer Olympics  was held in Savannah but Paralympic event did not use those facilities, instead holding the event on Lake Lanier based around the Aqualand Marina. The distance between Savannah and Atlanta was probably the motivation for this as it was important to showcase the sport.

References 

 

1996 Summer Paralympics events
1996
Paralympics
Sailing competitions in the United States